"Storms in Africa" is a song by the Irish singer-songwriter Enya recorded for her second studio album Watermark (1988). A rearranged version with English lyrics called "Storms in Africa (Part II)" was included in some later pressings of Watermark, and released as a single in June 1989 that reached number 41 on the UK Singles Chart.

The song was included on the soundtrack for the film Green Card (1990). For a time, the Australian airline Ansett Airlines used the song as its theme prior to its collapse in 2001.

Critical reception
Ned Raggett from AllMusic noted that "Storms in Africa" uses drums from Chris Hughes "to add to the understated, evocative fire of the song, which certainly lives up to its name."

Track listing

12" vinyl and CD B-sides

Charts

References

External links

1989 singles
Enya songs
Songs with lyrics by Roma Ryan
Songs with music by Enya
1988 songs
EMI Records singles
Reprise Records singles